Butterfly is a studio album by Kimiko Kasai with Herbie Hancock, originally released only in Japan in 1979.
This is the only one vocal collection album of Hancock's composition, including six tracks, with accompaniment by Hancock's regular group.
The title track "Butterfly" makes an appearance following the original album Thrust (1974), and this is also a vocal version.
In 2018, this album was reissued in the UK from Be With Records.

Track listing

Personnel 

 Kimiko Kasai - vocals
 Herbie Hancock - keyboards, synthesisers, vocoder
 Webster Lewis - organ, synthesizers
 Bennie Maupin - soprano saxophone, tenor saxophone
 Ray Obiedo - guitar
 Paul Jackson - bass
 Alphonse Mouzon - drums
 Bill Summers - percussion

References 

Herbie Hancock albums
Jazz albums by Japanese artists